Christian Joy (b. December 22, 1973 as Christiane Joy Hultquist)   is an American costume designer and artist best known for her stage costume designs for  Yeah Yeah Yeahs lead singer Karen O. Using found articles and occasionally eschewing thread and print for glue and marker pens she has influenced contemporary fashion with punk and DIY stylings.

Career
Christian Joy was born in Marion, Iowa, US.  She  started designing in Brooklyn, NYC in 2000. With no formal training in fashion design, she started creating one of a kind hand-painted/hand-sewn t-shirts and re-designing old prom dresses.  She met Karen O in 2001 and the aspiring  singer soon became her favorite model.  As the Yeah Yeah Yeahs began playing shows Joy designed a fresh outfit for each occasion. As the band's fame grew so did Joy's reputation and, in September 2002, she mounted a solo show Brat Style during NYC Fashion week.

As the Yeah Yeah Yeahs achieved international success Joy was able to pursue her designing work full-time.

In 2007 her costume designs were featured at the Victoria & Albert Museum in London as part of the New York Fashion Now exhibit.

In 2008 Joy took on dressing UK band Klaxons persuading them to give up their trademark neon outfits. She collaborated with TopShop on three limited-edition collections, and released her first personal ready-to-wear garments.

In Feb 2009 Joy had her first solo exhibition, The Visitors Must Be Amused, at the AVA gallery in NYC. Joy asked associates to write a description of a female being and then designed a costume representing each definition, including one of an alien goddess gown with a whip.

In September 2009 Joy costumes were featured in a Where The Wild Things Are pop-up shop in Los Angeles.

In 2011 Joy created the costumes for Stop the Virgens a "psycho opera" created by Karen O and KK Barrett

In May 2012 Joy presented Do Androids Dream of Electric Shrimp? at the Diesel Art Gallery in Tokyo. The exhibition was a combination of past Karen O costumes, new "Kite Costumes", videos featuring Joy's designs and poster and textile prints. In November 2012 the exhibition was moved to New York City, where it was held at Picture Farm Gallery in Williamsburg, Brooklyn.

Joy has also created costumes for Santigold and Danish singer/songwriter Oh Land.

In September 2013 Joy mounted an art installation show Bok Joy at Secret Project Robot in Brooklyn.

Press

Joy received her first major press in the June–July 2003 issue of Nylon magazine in a feature article - 'Even Odds' written by Johanna Lenander - on her Karen O wardrobe. In August 2003 Joy, in a Time profile, scoffed at her It girl status. In July 2004 Joy and her designs were a key element of a New York Times Sunday magazine feature about the growing influence of Indie Rock on fashion. In June 2005 Joy was again featured in Nylon in an article entitled 'Quiet Riot'. December 2005's ELLEgirl introduced Christian Joy as a guru of 'DIY' Fashion.  A follow-up piece in April 2006 re-inforced her status.

In 2008 Joy contributed to Carrie Borzillo-Vrenna's book Cherry Bomb, mentioning John Waters as a style inspiration.

In January 2010 Joy's costumes appeared in a photo spread in The Block'''s Fame issue. In the accompanying interview, Joy discussed abandoning mass fashion for the DIY approach of using Etsy as her exclusive store. She is also featured in German fashion blog Two For Fashion.

In February 2010 Christian Joy was featured on the cover of Time Out New York'''s, Most Stylish New Yorkers 

Stop the Virgens Press: T-Magazine, "The Look of Karen O's Psycho Rock Opera" by Katie Chang, Photos by Ioulex

Do Androids Dream of Electric Shrimp? Press: The Japan Times, "Totally Wrapped In Joy" by Misha Janette and Samuel Thomas, Photo by Nick Zinner

References

External links
 Official website
 Christian Joy News!
 Karen O Costumes
 Urban Outfitters Where The Wild Things Are costume pics
 Christian Joy on StyleLikeU
 Alison Miller video interview  Jan 2010
 Christian Joy Fashion film by Claire Carré
 Confess! a film by Ioulex for Christian Joy

Artists from Cedar Rapids, Iowa
American fashion designers
Living people
1973 births
People from Marion, Iowa
20th-century American artists
21st-century American artists